Peter Carteret (born 1641, date of death unknown, but after 1676) was the Governor of the British colony of Albemarle (which would later become North Carolina) from 1670 to approximately 1672.

Early life and career
Carteret was born on the British Islands of Jersey. His parents were Helier de Carteret and Rachel La Cloche Carteret.

Carteret was appointed assistant governor of the Albemarle colony by the Lords Proprietor in 1664. Proprietor Sir George Carteret was Peter Carteret's fourth cousin. Peter Cateret was the brother of Philip Carteret. After Governor Samuel Stephens died in late 1669, the governor's council named Carteret acting governor. As Governor, Cateret was responsible for implementing the Fundamental Constitutions of Carolina.

He seems to have been appointed to the post permanently by the Lords Proprietor in 1670 and then left for England in 1672 to talk to the Proprietors about discontent in the colony. He appointed John Jenkins as his deputy, to act in his place, but Carteret never returned to the colony, despite an apparent desire to do so. Instead, in November 1676, Carteret ended up giving power of attorney over his interests in the region to William Crawford, who proceeded to liquidate those interests.

References

See also
Biography at Carolana.com
https://web.archive.org/web/20140715104559/http://decarteret.org.uk/database/ps01/ps01_153.htm/

1641 births
American colonial people
British colonial governors and administrators in the Americas
Year of death unknown
Peter